Hilden Salas Castillo (born 19 July 1980 in Arequipa, Peru) is a Peruvian Retired footballer who plays as a midfielder.

International career
Nickanemd Pato, Salas has made two appearances for the Peru national football team.

References

External links
 
 

1980 births
Living people
People from Arequipa
Association football midfielders
Peruvian footballers
Peru international footballers
FBC Melgar footballers
Cienciano footballers
Sport Huancayo footballers
José Gálvez FBC footballers
Peruvian Primera División players